Castelfranco di Sotto is a comune (municipality) in the Province of Pisa in the Italian region Tuscany, located about  west of Florence and about  east of Pisa.

Castelfranco di Sotto borders the following municipalities: Altopascio, Bientina, Fucecchio, Montopoli in Val d'Arno, San Miniato, Santa Croce sull'Arno, Santa Maria a Monte.

History 
Castelfranco is an ancient medieval village, whose name appeared for the first time in 1215. Tired of the  battles fought in the area at the time between Florence, Lucca and Pisa, the population of nearby villages Vigesimo, Catiana, Paterno and Carpugnana decided to build here a defensive castle,  named Castello di Franco, later changed to  Castelfranco.

In 1966 Castelfranco was flooded by the  river Arno.

Culture
Every year in Castelfranco  the Palio dei Barchini is held.

References

External links

 Official website

Cities and towns in Tuscany